Camille Felton (born October 21, 1999 in Laval, Quebec) is a Canadian actress. She is known for her role as Noémie in Noémie: Le Secret, with Rita Lafontaine and Nicolas Laliberté, and for her role in Aurelie Laflamme's Diary (Le Journal d'Aurélie Laflamme). In 2010, for her role as Noémie, Felton won the DIAMOND Award for Best Young Actress at the SCHLINGEL International Film Festival in Chemnitz, Germany.

Biography 
Camille Felton was born 21 October 1999 in Canada.
Young, as an actress, made her beginnings on big screen where she had the role of Noémie in the movie Noémie: Le Secret beside Rita Lafontaine and Nicolas Laliberté.

In the following years, she appeared in Les chroniques d'une mère indigne, Le Journal d'Aurélie Laflamme, La Dernière Fugue, Les Invincibles, Bienvenue aux dames, Toute la vérité, 30 vies and in the web project Juliette en Direct, which has been rewarded with a Gémeaux award, a Numix award and of the grand excellence price of l'Alliance Médias Jeunesse 2012.

In autumn 2012, Camille embodied the character Émilie in Trauma and is part of the Un sur deux distribution, a dramatic comedy of TVA (Canada), where she is the character Léa. She is also a member of the Fan Club show team as a columnist for the sandwich challenges. She participates in the youth series Subito texto since January 6, 2014 where she plays Jennifer Blais.

In 2021 she was a competitor in the Quebec edition of Big Brother Célébrités.

Filmography 
 2008 : The Last Escape (La Dernière Fugue)
 2008 : Les Invincibles : young Lyne
 2009 - 2010 : Bienvenue aux dames : Sabrina
 2009 : Chronique d'une mère indigne
 2009 : Les Gags juste pour rire : silent role
 2009 : Aurelie Laflamme's Diary (Le Journal d'Aurélie Laflamme) : Aurélie (9 years old)
 2009 : Les Hauts et les Bas de Sophie Paquin : Séréna
 2010 : Noémie : Le Secret : Noémie
 2010 : Toute la vérité : Noémie
 2010 - 2012 : Juliette en direct : Juliette 
 2011 : Fan Club : sandwich columnist
 2012 : 30 vies : Zoé Poulin
 2012 - 2015 :  : Léa Belmont-Gascon
 2012 :  Trauma : Émilie Roche
 2013 : Subito texto : Jennifer Blais
 2019: Matthias & Maxime: Ericka
 2021 :  Big Brother Célébrités : Herself (Contestant)
 2021 : Portrait-Robot | Adèle

Advertisements 
 2007 :Belle band
 2007 : Education minister
 2007 : IGA
 2007 : McCain (Smoothies)  
 2008 : Canadian Tire (voix)
 2009 : Forget group
 2010 : Bécel

References

External links 
 

1999 births
Living people
Actresses from Quebec
Canadian film actresses
Canadian television actresses
People from Laval, Quebec
Big Brother Canada contestants